Tapey is a young Tibetan monk from Kirti Monastery. His attempted self-immolation on February 27, 2009, in the marketplace in Ngawa Town, Ngawa County, Sichuan, marked the beginning of a wave of Tibetan self-immolations.

Notes

Tibetan Buddhist monks